The 2022 Asansol Municipal Corporation election was held on 12 February 2022 to elect 106 members of the Asansol Municipal Corporation (AMC) which governs Asansol, the 2nd largest city of the Indian state of West Bengal in the district of Paschim Bardhaman.

Schedule

Voter Statistics

Parties and alliances
Following is a list of political parties and alliances which contested in this election:

Candidates

Result
Word no 61 result on 14 .02.2022}}

Bye-Elections

References

Asansol
Local elections in West Bengal
A
Asansol